Carina Ohlsson (born 14 June 1957), is a Swedish social democratic politician who served as member of the Riksdag from 1998 to 2022. She is set to become Member of the European Parliament following Jytte Gutelands resignation.

She was chairperson of the Social Democratic Women in Sweden from 2013 to 2021.

References

External links
 Carina Ohlsson at the Riksdag website 

1957 births
Living people
Members of the Riksdag from the Social Democrats
Women members of the Riksdag
21st-century Swedish women politicians
Members of the Riksdag 1998–2002
Members of the Riksdag 2002–2006
Members of the Riksdag 2006–2010
Members of the Riksdag 2010–2014
Members of the Riksdag 2014–2018
Members of the Riksdag 2018–2022
Members of the Riksdag 2022–2026